The 2017–18 Tahiti Cup (also known as Coupe Tahiti Nui) was the 79th edition of the national cup in Tahitian football. AS Dragon won the title beating AS Vénus in the final, earning the right to represent Tahiti in the 2018–19 Coupe de France, entering the seventh round.

Participating teams

Ligue 1 (9 Teams) 

AS Aorai
AS Central Sport
AS Dragon
AS Manu-Ura
AS Pirae
AS Taiarapu
AS Tamarii Punaruu
AS Tefana
AS Vénus

Ligue 2 (6 Teams) 

A.S. Arue
AS Excelsior
AS Jeunes Tahitiens
AS Olympique Mahina
A.S. Papenoo
A.S. Vaiete

Ligue 3 (1 Team) 

A.S. Papara

Ligue 2 Moorea (4 Teams) 

AS Temanava
A.S. Tiare Anani
A.S. Tiare Hinano
A.S. Tiare Tahiti

First round

Round of 16

ia

Round of 8

Semifinals

Final

See also
2017–18 Tahiti Ligue 1

External links
Coupe de Tahiti Nui, Fédération Tahitienne de Football

References

Tahiti Cup
Tahiti
Tahiti
Ligue 1
Ligue 1